Vestia may refer to:

Vestia (gastropod), a genus of snails in the family Clausiliidae
Vestia (plant), a monotypic genus in the family Solanaceae
Vestia (public housing organization), a Dutch housing organization